Ramp n' Roll was the 1995 game for the FIRST Robotics Competition.

Field

The playing field is a carpeted modified T-shaped area. The goal area is made up of three ramps and two slopes leading to a square platform. In each match, three teams compete to put their own balls over a field goal.

Robots
The robots used two 12 volt Milwaukee drill motors, four Delco car seat motors, and two Textron pneumatic pumps which, through a customized remote control system, were powered by two 12 volt Milwaukee Drill batteries.

Scoring
Two points are scored to score a  diameter ball over the goal and three points are awarded for passing a  diameter ball through the field goal. In the case of a tie, the higher large ball in the goal area breaks the tie. If no balls are within the goal area, the large ball closest to the center of the top of the platform wins.

References

External links

1995 in robotics
FIRST Robotics Competition games